Sydney Long (20 August 1871 – 23 January 1955) was an Australian artist.

Early life
Born on 20 August 1871 at Ifield, Goulburn, New South Wales, Sydney Long began formal art classes at the New South Wales Art Society in 1890. In 1894 his Heidelberg School-influenced painting, a bathing scene set on the Cooks River By Tranquil Waters (1894) caused a small scandal, but was purchased by the Art Gallery of New South Wales.

Career
The sale brought Long to the attention of Julian Ashton, a Trustee of the Gallery and founder of the influential Julian Ashton Art School (at that time called the Sydney Art School), and in 1907 he became Ashton's second-in-command in the school. In 1898 he was briefly engaged to Thea Proctor.
 
In 1910 he moved to London, where he learned etching and became an associate of the Royal Society of Painters, Etchers and Engravers. He returned to Australia in 1921 and helped found the Australian Painters, Etchers and Engravers Society, lived in England for the period 1922–1925, then returned once more to Australia, becoming President of the Society. From 1933 to 1949 he was a Trustee of the Art Gallery of New South Wales.

He won the Wynne Prize twice; in 1938 for The Approaching Storm, and in 1940 for The Lake, Narrabeen. He remained a director of the Society for many years, as well as remaining an active art teacher. In 1952 he returned once again to England.

Style

While influenced by the Heidelberg School, Long's first successful painting, By Tranquil Waters (1894), shows a markedly different engagement with the Australian scene: where Heidelberg artists such as Arthur Streeton and Frederick McCubbin showed the Bush as a place of work and struggle (and occasional sentimentality), Long's painting of young naked bathers is hedonistic and charged with low-key eroticism – the eroticism, rather than the nudity per se, was the cause of the scandal. After 1895 Long moved even further from the Heidelberg School's approach to the Australian landscape (a fusion of Victorian genre painting and a Barbizon-like plein air informal realism), seeking instead to achieve "soulful and graceful evocations of the spirit of the land, as did the Greeks and their beautiful myths." In practice this resulted in a new school of Australian Paganism, reflected in the literature of the period as much as in the art, and counting among its practitioners Lionel Lindsay and his brother Norman.

Long's greatest triumph in this style was The Spirit of the Plains (1897), using the flowing patterns and pastel colours of Art Nouveau to create a poetic vision of the Australian bush as the incongruous setting for a naked Grecian wood-nymph leading a procession of dancing brolgas. "Synthesising shimmering visual form, mythological subject and musical allusion Long established his vision of landscape as a dream-like, poetic formulation." Another example of this style is his work depicting the mythological god Pan (1898) which was purchased by the Art Gallery of New South Wales.

These works painted after 1897 were extremely popular, and provided the money to allow him to fulfill his dream of studying in London after 1910. He studied printmaking at the Central School of Arts and Crafts and was taught etching by Frank Emanuel and Malcolm Osborne. His post-1910 work retained only the faintest lingerings of the earlier Australian poetic landscapes.

There is an excellence in etchings which can be found in 'Young Kookaburras' 1925, examples of which are located at the Art Gallery of New South Wales and a private collection in Doreen, Victoria.

A major exhibition of Long's works was held by the National Gallery of Australia from 17 August to 11 November 2012.

See also
Visual arts of Australia

References

External links

 Sydney Long at the Art Gallery of New South Wales
 Sydney Long at the Australian Dictionary of Biography written by Joanna Mendelssohn 1986

Australian painters
1871 births
1955 deaths
Australian bird artists
Art Nouveau painters
People from Goulburn
Symbolist painters